Little Italy is a neighborhood on the west side of Wilmington, Delaware.

Little Italy is bounded roughly by 4th Street to the south, Union Street to the west, Clayton Street to the east, and Pennsylvania Avenue to the north. Like other neighborhoods with the "Little Italy" designation, Little Italy in Wilmington has a large Italian-American population. There are several Italian-American owned and operated businesses, including restaurants, law firms, and photographers, located in Little Italy.

One of the central features of Little Italy is St. Anthony's of Padua Roman Catholic Church, which also includes a grade school and the Padua Academy, located outside of Little Italy but nearby on Wilmington's west side. St. Anthony's also hosts the Italian Festival, a week-long festival which takes place annually in June and celebrates Italian culture through food, music, a midway with rides and games, and games of chance generally found next to the church building.

Notable people
In 2010, a 78 minute documentary about the history of Little Italy in Wilmington, Delaware and Saint Anthony's Church which is entitled Bells On The Hill was released. The premiere screening sold out four days in advance at the local Wilmington, independent venue Theatre N. The film was written and directed by Gus Parodi and Matt Swift

References

External links
 St. Anthony of Padua Parish
 West End Neighborhood House
  Gus Parodi : Stories From the Hill

Italian-American culture in Delaware
Little Italys in the United States
Music venues in Delaware
Neighborhoods in Wilmington, Delaware
Festivals in Delaware